Acanthodasys is a genus of worms belonging to the family Thaumastodermatidae.

The species of this genus are found in Europe and the Americas.

Species:

Acanthodasys aculeatus 
Acanthodasys algarvense 
Acanthodasys arcassonensis 
Acanthodasys australis 
Acanthodasys caribbeanensis 
Acanthodasys carolinensis 
Acanthodasys comtus 
Acanthodasys ericinus 
Acanthodasys fibrosus 
Acanthodasys flabellicaudus 
Acanthodasys lineatus 
Acanthodasys paurocactus 
Acanthodasys silvulus

References

Gastrotricha